Nicolas Beney (born 14 September 1980) is a former Swiss football goalkeeper.

References

football.ch

1980 births
Living people
Swiss men's footballers
Switzerland youth international footballers
Switzerland under-21 international footballers
Swiss expatriate footballers
Swiss Super League players
Yverdon-Sport FC players
FC Schaffhausen players
FC Wil players
FC Vaduz players
FC Aarau players
FC Sion players
Swiss expatriate sportspeople in Liechtenstein
Expatriate footballers in Liechtenstein
Association football goalkeepers